Maillet may refer to:

People
 Andrée Maillet (1921–1995), Quebec writer
 Antonine Maillet (born 1929), Acadian novelist and playwright
 Benoît de Maillet (1656–1738), French diplomat
 Eddy Maillet (born 1967), Seychellois football referee
 Jacques Maillet (1926–2019), French rower
 Jacques-Léonard Maillet (1823–1894), French academic sculptor
 Nathalie Maillet (1970–2021), French architect and racecar driver
 Philippe Maillet (born 1992), Canadian ice hockey player
 Quentin Fillon Maillet (born 1992), French biathlete
 Robert Maillet (born 1969), Canadian actor and retired professional wrestler

Places
 Maillet, Allier, a former commune in the department of Allier
 Maillet, Indre, a commune in the department of Indre
 Mailly-Maillet, a commune in the department of Somme

Other uses
 Maillet's determinant, in mathematics
 SFCA Maillet, range of aeroplane models